Charles Bear Mintz (November 5, 1889 –  December 30, 1939) was an American film producer and distributor who assumed control over Margaret J. Winkler's Winkler Pictures after marrying her in 1924. The couple had two children, Katherine and William. Between 1925 and 1939, Mintz produced over 370 cartoon shorts.

Career 
Charles Mintz was unhappy with the production costs on Walt Disney and Ub Iwerks's Alice Comedies, and asked the two to develop a new character. The result was Oswald the Lucky Rabbit, the first animated character for Universal Pictures. In February 1928, when the character proved more successful than expected, Mintz hired away all of Disney's animators except Iwerks, who refused to leave Disney, and moved the production of the Oswald cartoons to his new Winkler Studio, along with Margaret Winkler's brother, George. After losing the Oswald contract to Walter Lantz, Mintz focused on the Krazy Kat series, which was the output of a Winkler-distributed property.

The Winkler Studio became known as the Mintz Studio after he took over in 1929. Mintz experienced his biggest success in Scrappy, which continued production after Mintz died. In 1933, Mintz's studio (Winkler Pictures) became known as Screen Gems. Mintz produced two theatrical cartoon series in the 1930s. Color Rhapsody began in 1934 and continued until 1949, after Mintz's death. Fables began in 1939 and continued until 1942.

In 1939, Mintz became indebted to Columbia, which resulted in him selling the studio to Columbia Pictures.

After a heart attack, Mintz died on December 30, 1939. Screen Gems remained open until 1946. The name was later be used for Columbia's television division, among other things. Walt Disney mentioned in an interview that Mintz cultivated his standards for high-quality cartoon movies, and he kept emphasizing them even after their contract ended.

Mintz was nominated for two Academy Awards for Best Short Subject. His first nomination was in 1935 for Holiday Land, and he was nominated again in 1938 for The Little Match Girl.

Charles Mintz was portrayed in the feature film Walt Before Mickey by Conor Dubin.

References

External links 
 
 

1889 births
1939 deaths
American film producers
American animated film producers
American film studio executives
Screen Gems
American Jews
St. Lawrence University alumni
Burials at Hollywood Forever Cemetery